The 2012 Russian Football Super Cup (Russian: Суперкубок России по футболу) was the 10th Russian Super Cup match, a football match which was contested between the 2011–12 Russian Premier League champion, Zenit Saint Petersburg, and the 2011–12 Russian Cup champion, Rubin Kazan.

The match was held on 14 July 2012 at the Metallurg Stadium, in Samara, Russia.

Match details

See also
2012–13 Russian Premier League
2012–13 Russian Cup

References

Super Cup
Russian Super Cup
Russian Super Cup 2012
FC Zenit Saint Petersburg matches
Sport in Samara, Russia